The 2023 Liberty Flames football team will represent Liberty University in the 2023 NCAA Division I FBS football season. The Flames will play their home games at Williams Stadium in Lynchburg, Virginia, and will compete as a first-year member of Conference USA. They will be led by first-year head coach Jamey Chadwell.

Schedule
Liberty and Conference USA announced the 2023 football schedule on January 10, 2023.

References

Liberty
Liberty Flames football seasons
Liberty Flames football